Sir John Douglas Clague  (13 June 1917 – 11 March 1981) was a British Hong Kong soldier and entrepreneur who spent most of his life in Hong Kong.

Early Years
Born in South Rhodesia, in 1917, Clague arrived in Hong Kong in 1940 as a lieutenant in the Royal Artillery, and on the outbreak of World War II became a prisoner in the Sham Shui Po PoW camp. He later escaped, and joined the British Army Aid Group in free China. On the ending of the war, he famously took the surrender of Japanese forces in Bangkok more or less single-handedly.

Business career
After the war, he became the tai-pan of the British Hong Kong hong Hutchison, better known as Hutchison Whampoa. He overstretched his finances, which resulted in HSBC taking over the firm, replacing Clague, and led to the sale of Hutchison Whampoa to Li Ka-Shing's Cheung Kong in 1979.

Clague was also one of the commandants of the Royal Hong Kong Auxiliary Police Force, and a member of both the Executive and the Legislative Councils of Hong Kong, when he succeeded Cedric Blaker on 21 March 1958. From 1950 to 1951 he was President of the Gunners Roll of Hong Kong.

Clague owned a lodge at Kam Tsin in the northern New Territories alongside many other wealthy people. 

He was also a racehorse owner and one time chairman of the Royal Hong Kong Jockey Club; it was under his tenure the Sha Tin Racecourse was developed. The Clague Garden Estate in Tsuen Wan is named for him, as he was also one of the longest serving chairmen of the Hong Kong Housing Society.

Personal

Clague was married to Lady Margaret Isolin Clague (née Cowley); they had three children (Jonathan, Penny and Isolin).

Sir John Douglas Clague died of cancer aged 64, in 1981. Lady Clague died in 2011.

References

1917 births
1981 deaths
British expatriates in Hong Kong
20th-century British businesspeople
Hong Kong justices of the peace
Royal Artillery officers
British Army personnel of World War II
British colonial police officers
World War II prisoners of war held by Japan
Escapees from Japanese detention
Members of the Executive Council of Hong Kong
Members of the Legislative Council of Hong Kong
Commanders of the Order of the British Empire
Recipients of the Military Cross
Hong Kong recipients of the Queen's Police Medal
British expatriates in Southern Rhodesia
Knights Bachelor